The Sangre de Cristo Wilderness is a long and narrow wilderness area covering  of the Sangre de Cristo Range centered about Saguache and Custer counties, Colorado. Smaller areas are located in Fremont, Alamosa, and Huerfano counties. The wilderness area is located on in the San Isabel and Rio Grande National Forests and Great Sand Dunes National Park and Preserve. The wilderness area is home to several fourteeners and quite a few thirteeners. Crestone Needle is considered the most difficult.

Flora & Fauna
This wilderness is home to black bears, cougars, elk, and bighorn sheep. Forested areas consist predominantly of spruce and aspen.

History
The Peaks had traditional and religious significance to the region's early Spanish settlers, hence the name, which means "Blood of Christ".

Geology
The faulted and uplifted mountains of the Sangre de Cristo are geologically distinct from the Spanish Peaks range to the east.

References

Wilderness areas of Colorado
Sangre de Cristo Mountains
Rio Grande National Forest
San Isabel National Forest
Protected areas of Alamosa County, Colorado
Protected areas of Custer County, Colorado
Protected areas of Fremont County, Colorado
Protected areas of Huerfano County, Colorado
Protected areas of Saguache County, Colorado
IUCN Category Ib
Sangre de Cristo National Heritage Area
Protected areas established in 1993
1993 establishments in Colorado